A slipcover (also called loose cover) is a fitted protective cover that may be slipped off and on a piece of upholstered furniture. Slipcovers are usually made of cloth. Slipcovers slip on and off, they come fresh, and may be removed for seasonal change, cleaning, moving, or storage.

Slipcovers are sometimes defined as "clothing for furniture." Indeed, they are tailored just as clothing is, and are fitted loosely or snugly to the taste of the owner or tailor. Some people order furniture upholstered in plain muslin with the intention of using slipcovers only.

History

In the days before home air conditioning was available, it was common to put slipcovers on upholstered furniture in the hot months of the year to protect the upholstery fabric from sweat, and slipcover tailors offered clear vinyl, or plastic slipcovers. These clear plastic slipcovers were available in large department stores such as Jordan Marsh or were custom made by artisans.

In some cities in the northeast U.S., slipcover tailors were sometimes given the nickname "summertime millionaires" as their busy season was in the spring and summer. Custom slipcovering was done then, each one cut and sewn to order.

In the 1960s, technology and production techniques made it possible to manufacture furniture that could be sold at prices at or below the price of a custom-made slipcover, and the practice of custom slipcovering for a time declined.

In recent years, there has been a renewed interest in custom slipcovering driven by the interior design industry and the popularity of the very casual shabby chic design style.

Technology and materials
As this new "looser" fitting style of slipcovers do not always require custom tailoring, some furniture manufacturers are beginning to offer "ready made" slipcovers.

Ready made, generic fit slipcovers are available at many mainstream retailers that sell linens (sheets). With these generic fit slipcovers, some effort is required to maintain a tailored look of a slipcover applied to a couch or loveseat, as usage of the furniture will pull at the edges of the slipcover, which are simply tucked under the cushions, all of one piece. Manufacturers often provide foam sticks to tuck slipcovers into the sides and creases of couches. Design and materials used have also improved allowing different kinds of generic slipcovers to be sold to consumers including elastic covers that fit near perfectly around a couch, loosely fitted covers that are placed over key areas of a couch, covers with skirts, and those made with material designed to withstand use from pets.

Custom fitted slipcovers can resemble upholstery in their fit. They are fabricated to the exact shape of the furniture. Custom slipcovers have cushions slipcovered separately from the frame. 

Techniques can be used to make a slipcover that will not shift and require re-tucking after every use. Slipcovers with elasticized bottom means that there are no straps needed to secure it in place and it stays exactly where you want it to without shifting or moving.

Slipcover material is usually stretchable fabric, polyester blend (polyester, cotton and elastane). Bi-elastic fabric can be stretched both vertically and horizontally for a perfect fit. Strings or ribbons are used to keep the cover in place.

Slipcover fabrication is a specialty offered by slipcover makers. Some upholsterers and drapery workrooms will also make slipcovers.

Industry
Slipcovering skills are revived every generation by new groups that tend to change in characteristics over decades.  Slipcover arts were once a close guarded secrets.

One constant is the cottage industry aspect: slipcovers are easily made by small groups, in the home or home-based businesses.  Historically a lower-wage occupation with a division of labor based on gender, slipcover sewers were often not taught or expected to cut.

Today, the trend is for more educated populations, more of them women, to choose this cottage industry product as a profession.  Each one person business tends to all the steps of the marketing and manufacturing.

These one-person businesses may jointly market their services.  The World Wide Web has contributed to the survival of slipcovering, slipcover artists have found one another in this way, through networks or professional listings.  Slipcover knowledge lately has been pooled and shared through this source.

The production of clear vinyl slipcovers, however, is not as great as it used to be. Modern upholstery fabrics are more durable; they are both more resistant to dirt and easier to clean. Many upholstery fabrics can in fact be washed in cold water without harm. Transparent vinyl slipcovers, although pleasing to look at, are often very uncomfortable to sit on, particularly on hot summer days. These days, it is almost impossible to get clear vinyl slipcovers without having to have them made custom.

See also 
 Cushion
 Foam rubber
 Sofa

References

External links
 How to make a sofa Slipcover (wikiHow)
Upholstery
Furniture
Domestic implements